The 74 regional units of Greece (sing.) are the country's second-level administrative units. They are divisions of the country's 13 regions, and are further divided into municipalities.

They were introduced as part of the Kallikratis administrative reform on 1 January 2011 and are comparable in area and, in the mainland, coterminous with the 'pre-Kallikratis' prefectures of Greece.

List

References

 
Regional units
Greece transport-related lists
Subdivisions of Greece